I've Been Around is a 1935 American drama film directed by Philip Cahn and starring Chester Morris, Rochelle Hudson and G. P. Huntley. On their wedding night, a woman tells her husband that she loves another man.

Plot

Cast
 Chester Morris as Eric Foster  
 Rochelle Hudson as Drue Waring  
 G. P. Huntley as Franklin 'Nick' De Haven  
 Phyllis Brooks as Gay Blackstone  
 Gene Lockhart as Sammy Ames  
 Isabel Jewell as Sally Van Loan  
 Ralph Morgan as John Waring  
 William Stack as Doctor  
 Henry Armetta as Italian  
 Dorothy Christy as Girl  
 Verna Hillie as Girl  
 Jean Fenwick as Girl  
 Patricia Caron as Girl  
 Carol Wines as Girl  
 Dorothy Granger as Girl 
 Lorin Raker as Elevator Man  
 C. Daniel Whipple as Orchestra Leader  
 King Baggot as Doorman  
 Frances Morris as Nurse  
 Julie Kingdon as Maid  
 William H. O'Brien as Waiter  
 Gloria Ann White as Child  
 Virginia Odeon as Governess 
 Sidney Bracey as Alex, Nick's Man  
 Patricia Chapman as Girl 
 Arnold Gray as Waiter  
 Jack Mulhall as Undetermiend Role  
 Betty Blythe as Woman

References

Bibliography
 Quinlan, David. The Film Lover's Companion: An A to Z Guide to 2,000 Stars and the Movies They Made. Carol Publishing Group, 1997.

External links
 

1935 films
1935 drama films
American drama films
Universal Pictures films
American black-and-white films
Films produced by B. F. Zeidman
1930s English-language films
1930s American films